Vladimir Andreyevich Bulatenko (born 22 September 1986) is a Russian former professional football player.

Club career
He played two seasons in the Russian Football National League for FC Chita and FC Shinnik Yaroslavl.

External links
 
 

1986 births
Footballers from Moscow
Living people
Russian footballers
Association football defenders
FC KAMAZ Naberezhnye Chelny players
FC Lukhovitsy players
FC Shinnik Yaroslavl players
FC Torpedo Moscow players
FC Dynamo Bryansk players
FC Chita players